Vinko Buden (born 18 January 1986 in Zagreb) is a Croatian footballer who plays for NK Stupnik as a defender.

Club career
A central defender, Vinko Buden started his senior career with Lučko in the 2004-2005 season. In June 2007 he moved to Druga HNL club Vinogradar, where he played one season. After a very good season in the second division, he had the attention of several clubs from the Prva HNL and decided to sign a contract with Inter Zaprešić. In June 2008 he moved to Inter Zaprešić, where he played one and a half seasons. In January 2010, he joined Albanian Kastrioti Krujë. From his first game for Kastrioti Krujë he was turning attention on himself with his style and courage.  Six months later, he received an offer from Russia Baltika Kaliningrad and did not doubt for even a second - the decision was to go to Russia. After eight months at the club, in which Buden appeared in 11 matches, problems started. Problems with papers made him unemployed for four months. In June 2011 he returned in his first senior football club Lučko, now playing in the Croatian premier league. Vinko stayed for one and a half seasons. In January 2013, he looked for a new international club and signed a contract with Cypriot premier division club Achna, seeking to help them to stay in the elite rank.

References

External links
 
 PrvaLiga profile 

1986 births
Living people
Footballers from Zagreb
Association football defenders
Croatian footballers
NK Lučko players
NK Vinogradar players
NK Inter Zaprešić players
KS Kastrioti players
FC Baltika Kaliningrad players
Ethnikos Achna FC players
NK Krka players
CSM Ceahlăul Piatra Neamț players
Croatian Football League players
Kategoria Superiore players
Russian First League players
First Football League (Croatia) players
Cypriot First Division players
Slovenian PrvaLiga players
Liga I players
Croatian expatriate footballers
Expatriate footballers in Albania
Croatian expatriate sportspeople in Albania
Expatriate footballers in Russia
Croatian expatriate sportspeople in Russia
Expatriate footballers in Cyprus
Croatian expatriate sportspeople in Cyprus
Expatriate footballers in Slovenia
Croatian expatriate sportspeople in Slovenia
Expatriate footballers in Romania
Croatian expatriate sportspeople in Romania